"The Queen and Me" is a song by Australian rock band Mondo Rock, released in September 1982 as the second single from the band's third studio album Nuovo Mondo (1982). It peaked at number 40 on the Kent Music Report.

Track listing 
 "The Queen and Me" (Eric McCusker) - 3:21
 "Domination" (Ross Wilson, James Black, Paul Christie) - 4:25

Charts

References

Mondo Rock songs
1982 singles
1982 songs
Warner Music Group singles